The 1958 German football championship was the culmination of the football season in the Federal Republic of Germany in 1957–58. Schalke 04 were crowned champions for a seventh time after a group stage and a final.

It was the club's first title since 1942 and also its last, as of present. It was won in impressive fashion, Schalke winning all its four finals games, scoring 19 goals and conceding only one; a reminder of how the club dominated German football in the 1930s and early 1940s. On the strength of this title, Schalke participated in the 1958–59 European Cup, where it was knocked out in the quarter finals by Atlético Madrid.

For Hamburg, it was the second lost final in a row, having lost 4–1 in 1957 to Borussia Dortmund and having to wait another two seasons for its first title since 1928.

The format used to determine the German champion was the same as in the 1957 season. Nine clubs qualified for the tournament, with the runners-up of West and Southwest having to play a qualifying match. The remaining eight clubs then played a single round in two groups of four, with the two group winners entering the final.

Qualified teams
The teams qualified through the 1957–58 Oberliga season:

Competition

Qualifying round

Replay

Group 1

Group 2

Final

References

Sources
 kicker Allmanach 1990, by kicker, page 164 & 177 - German championship 1958

External links
 German Championship 1957-58 at Weltfussball.de
 Germany - Championship 1957-58 at RSSSF.com
 German championship 1958 at Fussballdaten.de

1958
1